Jammin' with the Cats is the debut studio album by Australian blues rock musician Nathan Cavaleri. The album was released in April 1993 and peaked at number 33 on the ARIA Charts.

Track listing
 "Cavazalley" - 2:56
 "Josh's Boogie" - 2:47	
 "The Stumble" - 3:19
 "12 Page Blues" - 3:51	
 "Sleepwalk" - 2:47
 "Jazz for Miss Robson" - 3:53	
 "Room 335" - 3:16
 "All for Love" - 3:53
 "Caldonia" 2:57
 "Winter Time Blues" - 4:15	
 "Nat's Blues" - 4:00

Charts

Release history

References

1993 debut albums
Nathan Cavaleri albums
Mushroom Records albums